Bhullarai is a village in Tehsil Phagwara, Kapurthala district, in Punjab, India. The village is administrated by a Sarpanch, who is an elected representative. Harbhajan Singh Rai(Master) runs Bhullarai

Transport
Phagwara Junction Railway Station,  Mandhali Railway Station are the very nearby railway stations to Bhullarai however, Jalandhar City Rail Way station is 22 km away from the village.  The village is 117 km away from Sri Guru Ram Dass Jee International Airport in Amritsar and the another nearest airport is Sahnewal Airport  in Ludhiana which is located 44 km away from the village.

References

External links
  Villages in Kapurthala
 Kapurthala Villages List

Villages in Kapurthala district